The Communist Party of Great Britain was in existence from 1920 to 1991, and succeeded by the Communist Party of Britain.

Communist Party of Great Britain or Communist Party of Britain may also refer to:
Communist Unity Group, an early communist group which joined the CPGB in 1920
Communist Party of Britain, a continuity organisation of the CPGB formed in 1988
Communist Party (British Section of the Third International), active during 1920
Communist Party of Great Britain (Provisional Central Committee), founded in 1980 but adopted the current name in the 1990s
Communist Party of Britain (Marxist–Leninist), an anti-revisionist group formed in 1968
Communist Party of Great Britain (Marxist–Leninist), an anti-revisionist group founded in 2004
Communist Party of South Wales and the West of England
Communist Workers' Party, a left communist group active during the early 1920s
New Communist Party of Britain, an anti-revisionist group formed in 1977
Revolutionary Communist Party (UK, 1944), a Trotskyist group which existed from 1944 to 1949
Revolutionary Communist Party (UK, 1978), a Trotskyist group formed in 1978 and disbanded in the late 1990s
Revolutionary Communist Party of Britain (Marxist–Leninist), an anti-revisionist group formed in 1979, previously Maoist